The 1966 California gubernatorial election was held on November 8, 1966. The election was a contest primarily between incumbent governor Pat Brown and former actor Ronald Reagan, who mobilized conservative voters and defeated Brown in a landslide. As of the 2022 gubernatorial election, this is the last time an incumbent Governor of California lost re-election.

Background
Incumbent governor Pat Brown had been relatively popular. After his re-election victory over former vice president Richard Nixon in 1962, Brown was strongly considered for Lyndon B. Johnson's running mate in 1964. However, Brown's popularity began to sag amidst the civil disorders of the Watts riots and the early student protests at the University of California, Berkeley including the Free Speech Movement. His decision to seek a third term as governor after promising earlier that he would not do so also hurt his popularity.

Primaries
California's liberal Republicans including George Christopher leveled attacks on Ronald Reagan for his conservative positions. Reagan popularized the eleventh commandment created by California Republican Party chairman Gaylord Parkinson. In his 1990 autobiography An American Life, Reagan attributed the rule to Parkinson, explained its origin, and claimed to have followed it, writing, "The personal attacks against me during the primary finally became so heavy that the state Republican chairman, Gaylord Parkinson, postulated what he called the Eleventh Commandment: Thou shalt not speak ill of any fellow Republican. It's a rule I followed during that campaign and have ever since." Parkinson used the phrase as common ground to  prevent a split in the party and the liberals eventually followed his advice.

Results

Campaign
With the nomination of Reagan, a well-known and charismatic political outsider-actor, the Republicans seized upon Brown's sudden unpopularity evidenced by a tough battle in the Democratic primary. Nixon worked tirelessly behind the scenes and Reagan trumpeted his law-and-order campaign message, going into the general election with a great deal of momentum. After pollsters discovered that the Berkeley student protests were a major priority of Republican voters, Reagan repeatedly promised to "clean up the mess at Berkeley."

Brown initially ran a low-key campaign, declaring that running the state was his biggest priority. Reagan's lead in the polls increased and Brown began to panic. At first, Brown tried to smear Reagan's conservative supporters with "lame Nazi metaphors".  After Reagan deftly parried that tactic, Brown made a serious gaffe.  He ran a television commercial in which he used a rhetorical question to remind a group of elementary school children that John Wilkes Booth, another actor, had killed Abraham Lincoln.  Brown's crude comparison of Reagan to Booth based on their common background as actors—in the state that happens to be home to Hollywood—did not go over well with the California electorate. Within 48 hours, Reagan had overtaken Brown in the polls.

By election day, Reagan was ahead in the polls and favored to win a relatively close election. However, Reagan won decisively, with his raw vote margin of nearly one million surprising even his strongest supporters. Brown won in only three counties, Alameda, Plumas, and San Francisco. He narrowly won Alameda by about 2,000 votes and Plumas by about 100 votes.

Results

Results by county

References

Further reading
 Anderson, Totton J.; Lee, Eugene C. (1967), "The 1966 Election in California", Western Political Quarterly, 20#2 pp. 535–554 in JSTOR
 Becker, Jules, and Douglas A. Fuchs. "How two major California dailies covered Reagan vs. Brown." Journalism Quarterly 44.4 (1967): 645–653.
 Cannon, Lou. Governor Reagan: His rise to power (PublicAffairs, 2005).
 Cannon, Lou (2001), Ronald Reagan: The Presidential Portfolio (PublicAffairs, 2001)
 Cannon, Lou. "Preparing for the Presidency: The Political Education of Ronald Reagan" in A Legacy of Leadership: Governors and American History ed. by Clayton McClure Brooks (2008) pp 137–155. online
 Dallek, Matthew. The Right Moment: Ronald Reagan's First Victory and the Decisive Turning Point in American Politics (2000), 1966 election;
 De Groot, Gerard J. "'A Goddamned Electable Person': The 1966 California Gubernatorial Campaign of Ronald Reagan." History 82#267 (1997) pp: 429-448 online.
 De Groot, Gerard J. "Ronald Reagan and Student Unrest in California, 1966-1970." Pacific Historical Review 65.1 (1996): 107–129. online free
 Edwards, Anne.  Early Reagan: The Rise to Power (New York, 1987), includes 1966 election
 McKenna, Kevin. "The 'Total Campaign': How Ronald Reagan Overwhelmingly Won the California Gubernatorial Election of 1966." (Thesis, Columbia University, 2010)
 Pawel, Miriam. (2018). The Browns of California: the family dynasty that transformed a state and shaped a nation. New York: Bloomsbury Publishing.
 Rapoport, R. California Dreaming: The Political Odyssey of Pat & Jerry Brown. Berkeley: Nolo Press (1982) .
  summary
 Rarick, Ethan. "The Brown Dynasty." in Modern American Political Dynasties: A Study of Power, Family, and Political Influence ed by Kathleen Gronnerud and Scott J. Spitzer. (2018): 211–30.
 Reeves, Michelle. "Obey the Rules or Get Out": Ronald Reagan's 1966 Gubernatorial Campaign and the 'Trouble in Berkeley'." Southern California Quarterly (2010): 275–305. in JSTOR
 Rice, Richard B. The Elusive Eden: A New History of California. (McGraw-Hill, 2012). ). .
 Rogin, Michael Paul, John L. Shover. Political Change in California: Critical Elections and Social Movements, 1890-1966 (Greenwood, 1970).
 Rorabaugh, William J. Berkeley at War, the 1960s (Oxford University Press, 1989).
 Schuparra, Kurt. Triumph of the Right: The Rise of the California Conservative Movement, 1945-1966 (M.E. Sharpe, 1998).

External links
 Autumn and Cardboard: The 1966 California Gubernatorial Election
 Reagan Heritage
 Bepress (pg 13)
 SFgate

Gubernatorial
California
1966
November 1966 events in the United States
Ronald Reagan